WMDF-LD, VHF digital channel 4 (virtual channel 3), is a low-powered   Independent television station licensed to Miami, Florida, United States. The station owned by Leonard Slazinski. However, it neither has any programming, nor does it have a channel number.

History

The station originally signed on by PrideNation Network in 2006 as WGAY-LP (aka Proud Television), it was known for being the first terrestrial television station in the United States to cater to the LGBT community, with a selection of original programming and specials, plus movies about, or appealing to, LGBT culture, as well as repeats of The Lucy Show and One Step Beyond, plus infomercials. It was also seen locally on Comcast channel 75, and worldwide on the internet.

However, due to economic troubles, Proud Television closed down sometime in 2008. PrideNation would sell the station to Three Grand TV of Altamonte Springs, which would re-call the station as WMDF-LP.

In January 2012, the station converted to a digital license, as WMDF-LD.

In April 2012, the station would be transferred to Paradise TV of Sarasota, retaining Three Grand TV as a licensee.

Technical information

Subchannels
The station's digital signal is multiplexed:

References

External links 

Low-power television stations in the United States
Independent television stations in the United States
MDF-LD